Hans Bund, also Jack Bund, (15 August 1898 – 1 February 1982) was a German pianist, conductor, composer and arranger in the field of light music.

Life 
Born in Neunkirchen (Saarland), Bund received his first piano lessons from his father, who was a music teacher in Saarbrücken. Later he went to Berlin, continued his education at the Berlin University of the Arts in piano, organ, counterpoint, musical composition and conducting with Ernst von Dohnányi, among others, and graduated with distinction in 1919.

In the early 1930s, he founded the "Hans Bund Jazz Orchestra", which he led as pianist and for which he wrote the arrangements in the Berlin cabaret . In 1932 he appeared with it among others in the film Der Sieger with Hans Albers. After renaming it the Bravour Orchestra, further film and radio productions followed.

After the end of National Socialism, he was employed in April 1946 by the British supervisor for Music at Nordwestdeutscher Rundfunk, Captain Ken Bartlett, at the Cologne radio station to put together a new band there. He then formed a 35-man orchestra, which had its first concert as early as June 1946 and from which the WDR Rundfunkorchester Köln developed in 1947. As a smaller formation, he established a new ensemble at WDR in 1948 called "Hans Bund und seine Solisten", which preferred more of a chamber music style of music-making and which he led until 1959. After leaving WDR in 1962, he moved into his retirement home in Rottach-Egern in Bavaria and continued to compose pieces in the field of light music.

Bund died in Rottach-Egern at the age of 83.

Compositions 
 Eine kleine Dorfgeschichte (1938)
  (1939)
 In spanischen Gärten
 Albernes und Frivoles
 The little guards
 Fest im Belvedere
 Eine Viertelstund
 Liebe und Leben
 Der Charmeur
 Spanischer Tanz
 Blumen im Wind
 Con amore
 Tanz der Puppen

Recordings 
 My Baby Parlafone 1932
 Vägen som går dit är lång lång lång (with Ernst Rolf), 1932
 Teddybärs Picknick, Odeon O-11744b
 Für ein bisschen Sonne (Bathing in the sunshine), Telefunken O-11658b
 Peter, Peter (with Gerda Gerold), Odeon O-11640b
 Auf einem Regenbogen (I'm dancing on a rainbow), Telefunken 1932
 Ein Lied geht um die Welt Telefunken 1933
 Orient-Express, Telefunken 1933
 SOS, Telefunken 1934
 Marietta, with Rudi Schuricke, Imperial 1938
 Kannst Du pfeifen, Johanna, with Erwin Hartung, Telefunken A1546
 Was bin ich ohne Dich, with Erwin Hartung, Telefunken A1665
 Was bin ich ohne dich Telefunken A1665
 Für eine Nacht voll Seligkeit, Polydor 1941
 Die alte Laube (from Briefe des Herzens), with Mimi Thoma, Polydor 47809/B
 Die Moritat vom kleinen Gedanken, with Mimi Thoma, Polydor 47985/A
 Wenn es Frühling wird, Bunds's Piano Rhythmiker, Parlophon 11570, 1941
 Nur eine Nacht voller Seligkeit, Bunds's Piano Rhythmiker, Parlophon 11570, 1941
 Wiener Bonbon, Hans Bund, großes Tanzorchester, Polydor 47590A, 1941
 Geschichten aus dem Wiener Wald, Hans Bund, großes Tanzorchester, Polydor 47590B, 1941
 Frühlingsstimmen, Hans Bund, Tanzorchester, Polydor 47650A, 1941
 An der schönen blauen Donau, Hans Bund, Tanzorchester, Polydor 47650B, 1941
 Ja, grün ist die Heide, Hans Bund, Bravour-Tanzorchester, Odeon O-11714a
 Harlekin, Hans Bund, Bravour-Tanzorchester, Odeon O-11714b
 Das war der Graf von Rüdesheim, Orchester Hans Bund, Gesang Willi Weiss, Telefunken A1511
 Bremer Stadtmusikanten, Orchester Hans Bund, Gesang Willi Weiss, Telefunken A1511
 Wenn der Brummbaß brummt,bin ich verliebt, Orchester Hans Bund, Ges.Erwin Hartung, Telefunken A1617
 Horch, der Kuckuck!, Orchester Hans Bund, Gesang Erwin Hartung, Telefunken A1617
 Ganz leis' erklingt Musik, Orchester Hans Bund, Gesang Rudi Schuricke, Polydor 47595A mx. 19½GX9

Filmography 
 Der Sieger, director: Hans Hinrich, with Hans Albers among others, Berlin 1932
 Das himmelblaue Abendkleid, director: Erich Engels, Berlin 1941

Further reading 
 Toby Thacker: Music after Hitler 1945-1955, Aldershot 2007
 Andreas Vollberg (Hrsg.): Von Trizonesien zur Starlight-Ära, Münster 2003
 Egon Wolff: Von Eysoldts "Germania"-Kapelle zum sinfonischen Allround-Ensemble. Das Kölner Rundfunkorchester im Wandel der Zeiten. In: "Zwar ist es leicht, doch ist das Leichte schwer". 50 Jahre Kölner Rundfunkorchester 1947-1997. Published by WDR, Cologne 1997

References

External links 
 
 
 
 

German pianists
German conductors (music)
German music arrangers
German composers
1898 births
1982 deaths
People from Neunkirchen, Saarland